Noqaddeh (also Romanized as Naqadeh and Noqqadeh; also known as Naqdī and Noqaddī) is a village in Hayaquq-e Nabi Rural District, in the Central District of Tuyserkan County, Hamadan Province, Iran. At the 2006 census, its population was 589, in 129 families.

References 

Populated places in Tuyserkan County